Al-Rahman al-Rahim Mosque or El-Rahman El-Raheem Mosque is an Egyptian mosque in Cairo. It is located in the Abbassiya neighborhood, on Salah Salem Street. The mosque is famous for having Islamic Motifs from various Islamic architectural styles. It was built by an Egyptian businessman and is famous for many wedding celebrations known as "Katb Ketab". It is also famous for hosting many high-profile funerals.

See also
 Lists of mosques
 List of mosques in Africa
 List of mosques in Egypt
 Islam in Egypt

References

Mosques in Egypt
Islamic architecture
Mosque buildings with domes
Mosques completed in 2009
21st-century religious buildings and structures in Egypt